Mary Amelia Bomar (died August 28, 2022) was the 17th Director of the National Park Service of the United States.

Early life and education 
Raised in Leicester, England, United Kingdom. Bomar became a U.S. citizen in 1977. Bomar died on August 28, 2022. Flags at all sites operated by the National Park Service were flown at half-staff in her 
honor on September 8, 2022.

Career 
From 2003 to 2005, Bomar was superintendent of Independence National Historical Park, and previously superintendent at Oklahoma City National Memorial. Later she served as the Regional Director for the Park Service's Northeast Region.

On September 5, 2006, Bomar was nominated by George W. Bush as the Director of the National Park Service, succeeding Fran P. Mainella. Following Senate confirmation, she was sworn into office on October 17, 2006, by United States Secretary of the Interior  Dirk Kempthorne at Independence Square in Philadelphia, Pennsylvania.

She retired from federal service on January 20, 2009.

References

See also
National Park Service

20th-century births
2022 deaths
Directors of the National Park Service
People from Leicester
Year of birth missing
English emigrants to the United States